The 2021 Chinese Football Association Division Two League season was the 32nd season since its establishment in 1989.

Team changes

To League Two
Teams promoted from 2020 Chinese Champions League
 Guangdong Lianghetang
 Xiamen Qudian
 Sichuan Huakun
 Yichun Jiangxi Tungsten Grand Tiger
 Hebei Jingying Zhihai
 Wuxi Xinje
 Quanzhou Addarmour
 Yanbian Hailanjiang
 Dandong Hantong

From League Two
Teams promoted to 2021 China League One
 Wuhan Three Towns
 Zibo Cuju
 Nanjing City
 Beijing BIT

Dissolved entries
 Jiangsu Yancheng Dingli
 Shenzhen Bogang

Name changes

Ahead of the 2021 season, the Chinese Football Association ordered all clubs to eliminate any corporate references in their names.

 Hubei Chufeng United F.C. changed their name to Hubei Istar in January 2021.
 Qingdao Zhongchuang Hengtai F.C. changed their name to Qingdao Youth Island in January 2021.
 Xiamen Qudian F.C. changed their name to Xiamen Egret Island in January 2021.
 Yunnan Kunlu F.C. changed their name to Kunming Zheng He Shipman in January 2021.
 Qingdao Jonoon F.C. changed their name to Qingdao Hainiu in January 2021.
 Xi'an Daxing Chongde F.C. changed their name to Xi'an Wolves in February 2021.
 Guangxi Baoyun F.C. changed their name to Guangxi Pingguo Haliao in February 2021.
 Guangdong Lianghetang F.C. changed their name to Dongguan United in February 2021.
 Xi'an UKD F.C. changed their name to Shaanxi Warriors Beyond in March 2021.
 Hebei Aoli Jingying F.C. changed their name to Hebei Zhuoao in March 2021.
 Hebei Jingying Zhihai F.C. changed their name to Hebei Kungfu in March 2021.
 Wuxi Xinje F.C. changed their name to Wuxi Wugou in March 2021.
 Shanghai Jiading Boji F.C. changed their name to Shanghai Jiading Huilong in March 2021.
 Zhejiang Yiteng F.C. changed their name to Shaoxing Keqiao Yuejia in March 2021.
 Sichuan Huakun F.C. changed their name to Sichuan Minzu in March 2021.
 Yichun Jiangxi Tungsten Grand Tiger F.C. changed their name to Yichun Grand Tiger in March 2021.
 Quanzhou Addarmour F.C. changed their name to Quanzhou Yassin in March 2021.
 Yanbian Hailanjiang F.C. changed their name to Yanbian Longding in March 2021.
 Dandong Hantong F.C. changed their name to Dandong Tengyue in March 2021.

Clubs

Stadiums and Locations

Clubs Locations

Managerial changes

Centralised venues
Group A: Duyun, Guizhou
Group B: Yancheng, Jiangsu
Group C: Luxi, Yunnan

First stage

Group A

League table

Results

Positions by round

Results by match played

Group B

League table

Results

Positions by round

Results by match played

Group C

League table

Results

Positions by round

Results by match played

Ranking of third-placed teams

Promotion stage

Group D

League table

Results

Positions by round

Results by match played

Promotion play-offs

Both Qingdao Youth Island and Guangxi Pingguo Haliao won their respective playoff matches against China League One opponents, and were promoted.

Relegation stage

Group E

League table

Results

Positions by round

Results by match played

Group F

League table

Results

Positions by round

Results by match played

Relegation play-offs

Overview

Matches

Qingdao Red Lions won 4–2 on aggregate.

Hubei Huachuang won 3–1 on aggregate.

Statistics

Top scorers

Hat-tricks

Notes

References

External links

3
China League Two seasons